Wuthering Heights is a 1954 Mexican film directed by Luis Buñuel. Its original Spanish title is Abismos de pasión.

In 1931, Buñuel and Pierre Unik wrote a screenplay based on the 1847 Emily Brontë novel Wuthering Heights but were never able to get financing. The 1954 film was produced by Óscar Dancigers and Abelardo L. Rodríguez. It stars Irasema Dilián and Jorge Mistral as the Cathy and Heathcliff characters.

Plot summary

Cast
 Irasema Dilián as Catalina
 Jorge Mistral as Alejandro
 Lilia Prado as Isabel
 Ernesto Alonso as Eduardo
 Francisco Reiguera as José
 Hortensia Santoveña as María
 Jaime González Quiñones as Jorge
 Luis Aceves Castañeda as Ricardo

References

External links
 
 

1954 films
1954 romantic drama films
Films directed by Luis Buñuel
1950s Spanish-language films
Films based on Wuthering Heights
Mexican romantic drama films
Mexican black-and-white films
1950s Mexican films